Abercromby may refer to:

 Abercromby (name) (includes a list of people with the surname Abercromby)
 Abercromby (UK Parliament constituency), 1885–1918
 Abercromby (Liverpool ward), an electoral ward of the Liverpool City Council
 Abercromby Square, Liverpool, England
 Abercromby (1795 ship), a British East India Company ship, wrecked 1812
 Captain Abercromby a UK children's television show
 Lord Abercromby (1745–1795), Scottish advocate, judge and essayist
 Clan Abercromby, a Scottish lowland clan

See also
 Abercrombie (disambiguation)